Ceylonthelphusa savitriae is a species of decapod in the family Gecarcinucidae.

The IUCN conservation status of Ceylonthelphusa savitriae is "CR", critically endangered. The species faces an extremely high risk of extinction in the immediate future. The IUCN status was reviewed in 2008.

References

Further reading

 

Ceylonthelphusa
Articles created by Qbugbot
Crustaceans described in 2005